The northern shrike (Lanius borealis) is a large songbird species in the shrike family (Laniidae) native to North America and Siberia. Long considered a subspecies of the great grey shrike, it was classified as a distinct species in 2017. Six subspecies are recognised.

Taxonomy
The northern shrike was formally described by the French ornithologist Louis Jean Pierre Vieillot in 1808 under its present binomial name Lanius borealis. In the 19th century, North American ornithologists considered it as a separate species from the great grey shrike, while European authorities held them to be the same species. American ornithologist Alden H. Miller investigated differences between the Siberian and Alaskan populations in 1930 and could find no consistent differences, hence he recommended combining the two into Lanius excubitor.

In North America, this and the related loggerhead shrike are commonly known as butcherbirds for their habit of impaling prey on thorns or spikes. A folk name from Michigan is winter butcherbird. The Vuntut Gwitchin First Nation people of Old Crow, Yukon call it Tzi kwut go katshi lyi. As a passerine, or song bird, it has no talons. It has the hooked beak of a raptor.

A 2010 study of mitochondrial DNA found that the northern shrike was most closely related to the Iberian grey shrike (Lanius meridionalis), the steppe grey shrike (Lanius pallidirostris), and the two formed a clade along with the Chinese grey shrike and loggerhead shrike.

Subspecies
East Eurasian group
 Lanius borealis sibiricus – eastern Siberia to northern Mongolia
Browner above than excubitor, distinct but delicate banding below. Some white on primary bases only.
 Lanius borealis bianchii – Sakhalin and possibly southern Kuril Islands
Smaller and paler than sibiricus, banding below pale and indistinct. Some white on primary bases only.
 Lanius borealis mollis – Russian Altai Mountains, north western Mongolia

Browner than sibiricus above, banding below well-developed. Little white on primary bases.
 Lanius borealis funereus – Tian Shan and western China
Large; quite dark and brownish, below bluish-grey with almost black banding. Little white on primary bases.

North American group
 Lanius borealis borealis – Hudson Bay region of Ontario and Quebec
Similar to excubitor, but darker with faint barring below. John James Audubon called this subspecies the great American shrike in his book Birds of America.
 Lanius borealis invictus – northern Alberta west to northern Alaska, perhaps also Chukchi Peninsula region in extreme north east Siberia
Larger and paler than borealis, paralleling homeyeri compared to excubitor.

Description
The loggerhead shrike can be distinguished from the northern shrike by its smaller size, darker grey plumage and larger black face mask that covers the eye completely. It also has a shorter bill with less prominent hook. Their calls are similar.

Measurements:

 Length: 
 Weight: 
 Wingspan:

Distribution and habitat
Observations of wintering habitats in Idaho suggest suitable wintering territories are in demand, as northern shrikes that died in a particular area were quickly replaced.

Feeding
Northern shrikes often sit on tall poles and branches surveying for food. They prey on arthropods such as spiders, beetles, bugs, and grasshoppers, and small vertebrates. Prey identified include passerine birds such as horned lark, black-capped chickadee, common starling, brewer's sparrow, white-crowned sparrow, dark-eyed junco, pine siskin, house sparrow, small mammals such as the vagrant shrew, western harvest mouse, deer mouse, long-tailed vole, meadow vole and house mouse, and reptiles such as spiny lizards. They have been observed hunting finches and house sparrows at bird feeders.

References

External links 
 Northern shrike – Lanius borealis – USGS Patuxent Bird Identification InfoCenter
 Northern shrike species account – Cornell Lab of Ornithology

northern shrike
northern shrike
Birds of North America
Birds of North Asia
northern shrike
northern shrike